Jean-Daniel Lafond  (born 18 August 1944) is a French-born Canadian filmmaker, teacher of philosophy, and the husband to the former Governor General Michaëlle Jean, making him the Viceregal Consort of Canada during her service.

Biography

Lafond was born in France during the liberation of Paris from the Nazis. After attending the class of Michel Foucault and Michel Serres, he taught philosophy from 1971 "while pursuing research in audio-visual training and communications". In 1974 Lafond left France for Quebec and became a Canadian citizen in 1981. After teaching at the Université de Montréal he left the university to focus on film-making, radio and writing.

From his first marriage Lafond has two daughters, as well as two grandchildren. With his current wife, former Governor General Michaëlle Jean, he has an adopted daughter.

Books
 Images d'un doux ethnocide, with Arthur Lamothe, Montréal, Ateliers audio-visuels du Québec, 1979.
 Vidéo-communication, with Claire Meunier, Montréal, Publications Grerdave, 1979.
 Pratique et analyse des médias en milieu éducatif, Montréal, Publications Grerdave, 1980.
 Le film sous influence : un procédé d'analyse, Paris, Édilig, "Médiathèque", 1982.
 Les traces du rêve, Montréal, L'Hexagone, 1991.
 La manière nègre ou Aimé Césaire, chemin faisant : genèse d'un film, Montréal, L'Hexagone, 1993.
 La liberté en colère : le livre du film, Montréal, L'Hexagone, 1994.
 Iran : les mots du silence, with Fred A. Reed, Laval, Les 400 Coups, 2006.
 Conversations in Tehran, with Fred A. Reed, Vancouver, Talon Books, 2006.
 Marie de l'Incarnation ou la déraison d'amour, with Marie Tifo, Montréal, Leméac, 2009.
 Un désir d'Amérique. Fragments nomades, Montréal, Édito, 2015.

Introduction
"Préface : la rencontre", in Olivier Ducharme et Pierre-Alexandre Fradet, Une vie sans bon sens. Regard philosophique sur Pierre Perrault, Montréal, Nota bene, 2016.

Filmography
 La Liberté en colère
 Tropique Nord
 Haïti dans tous nos rêves
 Dream Tracks (Les Traces du rêve)
 la Manière nègre ou Aimé Césaire chemin faisant
 L'Heure de Cuba
 Salam Iran
 Le Cabinet du docteur Ferron
 Le Fugitif ou les vérités d'Hassan
 Folle de Dieu
 Un film avec toi

Distinctions 
 Chevalier of l'Ordre des Arts et des Lettres, France (2014)
 Prize TV5 pour le meilleur documentaire de langue française
 Prize Lumières de l'Association québécoise des réalisateurs pour l'ensemble de son oeuvre
 Prize Gemini du meilleur réalisateur
 Prize Gemini pour l'image
 Prize Hot Docs pour le meilleur film politique, Toronto
 Member Royal Society of Canada
 "Saskatchewan Centennial Medal"
 Companion of the Order of Canada

Controversy 
When in 2005 his wife was nominated by Prime Minister Paul Martin as the next Governor General, controversy arose when his past resurfaced. While the personality of Michaëlle Jean was mostly accepted throughout Canada, Lafond himself had early on been suspected of being a Quebec separatist because of some of his movies. When an article in a sovereigntist journal made its way to the press, alleging that Lafond had befriended a former FLQ (militant Quebec-separatist organization) member who had built for him a cache "to hide weapons" in his library. Later in August, his wife reacted to this in a formal letter announcing she and her husband "had never adhered to a political party or to the sovereigntist ideology".

Confusion continues to surround his loyalties. In his book, La manière nègre (The Black Way), he wrote, "So, a sovereign Quebec? An independent Quebec? Yes, and I applaud with both hands and I promise to be at all the St. Jean [Baptiste] parades." However, in October 2005, in an interview with Radio-Canada he said, "I never believed that I could become a separatist. I have a great deal of difficulty with nationalism in general." He also called members of the sovereigntist movement who had called him a traitor, terrorists. At the same time he affirmed that he was a Québécois before a Canadian. He believes that he has always fought for the "cultural independence" of Quebec, but nothing further.

Lafond's 2006 film American Fugitive: The Truth About Hassan, a documentary about an American political activist who has admitted to assassinating an Iranian diplomat in 1980, who appeared, unexpectedly, in the 2001 film Kandahar, also stirred controversy.  The National Post asserted that the film was too sympathetic to David Belfield, the activist.

Honours
In 2010, he was made a member of the Royal Canadian Academy of Arts.

As the consort of the then Governor General, in 2005 he was appointed a Companion of the Order of Canada and was awarded the Saskatchewan Centennial Medal. During his wife's term of office, he held the courtesy style of His Excellency.

Arms

References

External links
Lafond's views on war from a Radio Canada interview
Haïti dans tous nos rêves

La Liberté en colère - Lafond's film on the October Crisis of 1970
Lafond's film Salam Iran : a Persian letter
A second commentary on La liberté en colère 

People from Allier
1944 births
Living people
Canadian documentary film directors
Canadian viceregal consorts
Companions of the Order of Canada
French film directors
French emigrants to Canada
French emigrants to Quebec
Members of the Royal Canadian Academy of Arts
Naturalized citizens of Canada
Film directors from Quebec